Cryoturris vincula is a species of sea snail, a marine gastropod mollusk in the family Mangeliidae.

Description
The length of the shell varies between 6 mm and 8.5 mm.

Distribution
C. vincula can be found in Caribbean waters, ranging from the western coast of Florida to the Lesser Antilles.

References

 Nowell-Usticke, G. W. "A supplementary listing of new shells." To be added to the checklist of the marine shells of St. Croix, Privately printed (1969): 1–32.
 Rosenberg, G., F. Moretzsohn, and E. F. García. 2009. Gastropoda (Mollusca) of the Gulf of Mexico, Pp. 579–699 in Felder, D.L. and D.K. Camp (eds.), Gulf of Mexico–Origins, Waters, and Biota. Biodiversity. Texas A&M Press, College Station, Texas

External links
  Tucker, J.K. 2004 Catalog of recent and fossil turrids (Mollusca: Gastropoda). Zootaxa 682: 1–1295.
 

vincula